Lars Mathias Florén (born 11 August 1976) is a Swedish former professional footballer who played as a left back.

During his career, he represented Alnö IF, GIF Sundsvall, IFK Norrköping, FC Groningen, IF Elfsborg, and IF Sylvia. In 2001, he won two caps for the Sweden national football team.

References

External links 
 Mathias Florén blir U19-tränare i IFK Norrköping 
 

1976 births
Living people
People from Söderhamn
Swedish footballers
Association football defenders
Sweden international footballers
Alnö IF players
GIF Sundsvall players
IFK Norrköping players
Swedish expatriate footballers
Expatriate footballers in the Netherlands
FC Groningen players
Swedish expatriate sportspeople in the Netherlands
IF Elfsborg players
Eredivisie players
IF Sylvia players
Allsvenskan players
Sportspeople from Gävleborg County